Natural hydrogen (known as white hydrogen), is naturally occurring molecular hydrogen on or in Earth (as opposed to hydrogen produced in the laboratory or in industry). The name white hydrogen distinguishes it from green hydrogen, which is produced from renewable energy sources, and from grey, brown or black hydrogen, which is obtained from fossil sources or from the electrolysis of water. Natural hydrogen may be renewable, non-polluting and allows for lower cost operation compared to industrial hydrogen.
Natural hydrogen has been identified in many source rocks in areas beyond the sedimentary basins where oil companies typically operate.

Origin of natural hydrogen 
There are several sources of natural hydrogen:

 degassing of deep hydrogen from the Earth's crust and mantle;
 reaction of water with ultrabasic rocks (serpentinisation);
 contact of water with reducing agents in the Earth's mantle;
 interaction of water with freshly exposed rock surfaces (weathering);
 decomposition of hydroxyl ions in the structure of minerals;
 Natural radiolysis of water;
 decomposition of organic matter;
 biological activity

Extraction 
Natural hydrogen is extracted from wells, mixed with other gases such as nitrogen or helium.

Several sources have been identified in France. Geologists Alain Prinzhofer and Eric Derville have demonstrated the existence of large reservoirs in a dozen countries, including Mali and the United States. However, their potential remains difficult to assess.

Numerous emanations on the ocean floor have been identified but are difficult to exploit. The discovery of a significant emergence in Russia in 2008 suggests the possibility of extracting native hydrogen in geological environments.

Geology 
Natural hydrogen is generated continuously from a variety of natural sources. There are many known hydrogen emergences on mid-ocean ridges. Another of the known reactions, serpentinisation, occurs under the sea floor (in the oceanic crust).

Diagenetic origin (iron oxidation) in the sedimentary basins of cratons, notably in Russia.
Other sources are being explored, such as mantle hydrogen, or hydrogen from radiolysis (natural electrolysis) or from bacterial activity.
In France, the Alps and Pyrenees are suitable for exploitation. New Caledonia has hyperalkaline sources that show dihydrogen emissions. A large accumulation of natural hydrogen was discovered in Bourakebougou (Mali).

Characteristics 
Dihydrogen is very soluble in fresh water, especially at depth (solubility increases with pressure).

Quality 
Natural hydrogen causes no CO2 emissions. Exploitation is competitive with steam forming, especially in co-valorisation.

Role in the ecological transition 
Natural hydrogen plays an important role in geopolitics. Natural hydrogen does not require an energy-intensive forming process, compared to other energy production methods.
Leakages (natural reserves) exceeds global consumption needs.
A technical review on this issue was made by Bretagne Développement Innovation.

Adequacy of renewable energy types

Legislation 
The current legal framework includes native hydrogen among the natural gases, for which legislation already exists, applied in particular by the United States.

Classification 
When natural hydrogen is produced by water-rock interaction, such as by hot geothermal fluids, the Academy of Technologies proposes to classify it as green hydrogen.

Operating cost  
Local production of native hydrogen eliminates long-distance transportation costs.

Pipeline network 
The UK is developing a pipeline network to transport native hydrogen.

In pop culture 
On Mount Chimera (now Yanartaş, Turkey), dihydrogen has been escaping and burning continuously for over 2,500 years. These fires are said to be the source of the first Olympic flame.

See also

Bibliography 
 
 
Gregory Paita, Master Thesis, Engie & Université de Montpellier.
 Moretti I., Pierre H. Pour la Science, special issue in partnership with Engie, vol. 485; 2018. p. 28. N march. Moretti I, D'Agostino A, Werly J, Ghost C, Defrenne D, Gorintin L. Pour la Science, special issue, March 2018, vol 485, 24 25XXII_XXVI.

Linked articles 
 Pure-play helium
 Electrofuel
 Hydrogen economy
 :fr:Hydrogène jaune (French) Yellow hydrogen produced from nuclear energy
 Hydrogen production

References

Hydrogen